The St Matthew Passion, BWV 244, is a Passion, a sacred oratorio written by Johann Sebastian Bach in 1727 for solo voices, double choir and double orchestra, with libretto by Picander. It sets the 26th and 27th chapters of the Gospel of Matthew (in the Luther Bible) to music, with interspersed chorales and arias. It is widely regarded as one of the greatest masterpieces of Baroque sacred music. The original Latin title  translates to "The Passion of our Lord J[esus] C[hrist] according to the Evangelist Matthew".

History

The St Matthew Passion is the second of two Passion settings by Bach that have survived in their entirety, the first being the St John Passion, first performed in 1724.

Versions and contemporaneous performances
Little is known with certainty about the creation process of the St Matthew Passion. The available information derives from extant early manuscripts, contemporary publications of the libretto, and circumstantial data, for instance in documents archived by the Town Council of Leipzig.

The St Matthew Passion was probably first performed on 11 April (Good Friday) 1727 in the St. Thomas Church, and again on 15 April 1729, 30 March 1736, and 23 March 1742. Bach then revised it again between 1743 and 1746.

First version (BWV 244.1, previously 244b)
In Leipzig it was not allowed to paraphrase the words of the Gospel in a Passion presentation on Good Friday. A setting of the then-popular Brockes Passion libretto, largely consisting of such paraphrasing, could not be done without replacing the paraphrases by actual Gospel text. That was the option chosen by Bach for his 1724 St John Passion. In 1725 Christian Friedrich Henrici, a Leipzig poet who used Picander as his pen name, had published  ("Edifying Thoughts on Maundy Thursday and Good Friday"), containing free verse suitable for a Passion presentation in addition to the Gospel text. Bach seems to have stimulated the poet to write more of such verse in order to come to a full-fledged libretto for a Passion presentation combined with the Passion text chapters 26 and 27 in the Gospel of St Matthew.

Since 1975, it has usually been assumed that Bach's St Matthew Passion was first performed on Good Friday 11 April 1727, although its first performance may have been as late as Good Friday 1729, as older sources assert. The performance took place in the St. Thomas Church (Thomaskirche) in Leipzig. Bach had been Thomaskantor (i.e., Cantor, and responsible for the music in the church) since 1723. In this version the Passion was written for two choruses and orchestras. Choir I consists of a soprano in ripieno voice, a soprano solo, an alto solo, a tenor solo, SATB chorus, two traversos, two oboes, two oboes d'amore, two oboes da caccia, lute, strings (two violin sections, violas and cellos), and continuo (at least organ). Choir II consists of SATB voices, violin I, violin II, viola, viola da gamba, cello, two traversos, two oboes (d'amore) and possibly continuo.

Funeral cantata for Köthen (BWV 1143, previously 244a)

Klagt, Kinder, klagt es aller Welt, BWV 244a, a cantata of which only the text is extant, was performed 24 March 1729 in Köthen at a memorial service held some months after the death of Leopold, Prince of Anhalt-Köthen. The music of the cantata consisted largely of music adapted from the St Matthew Passion.

Passion performances in the St. Thomas Church

At the time only men sang in church: high pitch vocal parts were usually performed by treble choristers. In 1730, Bach informed the Leipzig Town Council as to what he saw as the number of singers that should be available for the churches under his responsibility, including those for the St. Thomas Church: a choir of twelve singers, plus eight singers that would serve both St. Thomas and the Peterskirche. The request was only partially granted by the Town Council, so possibly at least some of the Passion presentations in St. Thomas were with fewer than twenty singers, even for the large scale works, like the St Matthew Passion, that were written for double choir.

In Bach's time, St. Thomas Church had two organ lofts: the large organ loft that was used throughout the year for musicians performing in Sunday services, vespers, etc., and the small organ loft, situated at the opposite side of the former, that was used additionally in the grand services for Christmas and Easter. The St Matthew Passion was composed as to perform a single work from both organ lofts at the same time: Chorus and orchestra I would occupy the large organ loft, and Chorus and orchestra II performed from the small organ loft. The size of the organ lofts limited the number of performers for each Choir. Large choruses, in addition to the instrumentists indicated for Choir I and II, would have been impossible, so also here there is an indication that each part (including those of strings and singers) would have a limited number of performers, where, for the choruses, the numbers indicated by Bach in his 1730 request would appear to be (more than?) a maximum of what could be fitted in the organ lofts.

Later revisions and performances (BWV 244.2, previously 244)
Bach revised the Passion by 1736, for a performance on Good Friday 30 March 1736. This is the version (with some possible later adjustments) that is generally known as the St Matthew Passion, BWV 244. In this version both choirs have SATB soloists and chorus, and a string section and continuo consisting of at least violins I and II, viola, gamba and organ. The woodwinds are two traversos, oboes and oboes d'amore for each choir, and in addition for choir I two oboes da caccia.

Some parts were adjusted for a new performance on Good Friday 23 March 1742. Bach finalized his autograph score in 1743–1746; however, this undertaking was not tied to any new performance.

Numbering of the movements

Bach did not number the sections of the St Matthew Passion, all of them vocal movements, but twentieth-century scholars have done so. The two main schemes in use today are the scheme from the Neue Bach-Ausgabe (NBA, New Bach Edition) which uses a 1 through 68 numbering system, and the older Bach-Werke-Verzeichnis (BWV, Bach Works Catalog) scheme which divides the work into 78 numbers. Both use lettered subsections in some cases. This article is written using the NBA numbering system.

Text 
Bach worked together with his librettist, Christian Friedrich Henrici, known as Picander who published the text of the libretto of the St Matthew Passion in 1729.

Bible text

Additionally, Song of Songs 6:1 is used in the opening aria (with chorus) of Part Two (No. 30).

Free verse
Picander wrote text for recitatives and arias, and for the large scale choral movements that open and close the Passion. Other libretto sections came from publications by Salomo Franck and Barthold Heinrich Brockes.

Chorales

The chorale melodies and their texts would have been known to those attending the services in the St Thomas church. The oldest chorale Bach used in the St Matthew Passion dates from 1525. Three chorales are written by Paul Gerhardt and Bach included five stanzas from his O Haupt voll Blut und Wunden.

In the early version BWV 244b the chorale No. 17 appears to be missing, and movement No. 29, concluding Part One, is a four-part setting of the chorale "Jesum lass ich nicht von mir" instead of the chorale fantasia on "O Mensch, bewein dein Sünde groß".

Composition 

Many composers wrote musical settings of the Passion in the late 17th century. Like other Baroque oratorio passions, Bach's setting presents the Biblical text of Matthew 26–27 in a relatively simple way, primarily using recitative, while aria and arioso movements set newly written poetic texts which comment on the various events in the Biblical narrative and present the characters' states of mind in a lyrical, monologue-like manner.

The St Matthew Passion is set for two choirs and two orchestras. Both include two transverse flutes (Choir 1 also includes 2 recorders for No. 19), two oboes, in certain movements instead oboe d'amore or oboe da caccia, two violins, viola, viola da gamba, and basso continuo. For practical reasons the continuo organ is often shared and played with both orchestras. In many arias a solo instrument or more create a specific mood, such as the central soprano aria No. 49, "", where the absence of strings and basso continuo mark a desperate loss of security.

Vocal parts
Two distinctive aspects of Bach's setting spring from his other church endeavors. One is the double-choir format, which stems from his own double-choir motets and those of many other composers with which he routinely started Sunday services. The other is the extensive use of chorales, which appear in standard four-part settings, as interpolations in arias, and as a cantus firmus in large polyphonic movements. This is notable in "", the conclusion of the first half – a movement which Bach also used as an opening chorus for the second version (1725) of his St John Passion (later – ca. 1730 – he reverted to the originally composed "Herr, unser Herrscher" there). The opening chorus, "" is also notable for the use of chorale cantus firmus, in which the soprano in ripieno crowns a colossal buildup of polyphonic and harmonic tension, singing a verse of "". This was sung only in 1742 and 1743–1746 and had been played on the organ before.

Gospel parts

The narration of the Gospel texts is sung by the tenor Evangelist in secco recitative accompanied only by continuo. Soloists sing the words of various characters, also in recitative; in addition to Jesus, there are named parts for Judas, Peter, two high priests (Pontifex I & II), Pontius Pilate, Pilate's wife (Uxor Pilati), two witnesses (Testis I & II) and two ancillae (maids). These are not always sung by all different soloists. The "character" soloists are also often assigned arias and sing with the choirs, a practice not always followed by modern performances. Two duets are sung by a pair of soloists representing two simultaneous speakers. A number of passages for several speakers, called turba (crowd) parts, are sung by one of the two choirs or both.

The words of Jesus, also termed Vox Christi (voice of Christ), usually receive special treatment. Bach created particularly distinctive accompagnato recitatives in this work: they are accompanied not by continuo alone, but also by the entire string section of the first orchestra using long, sustained notes and "highlighting" certain words, thus creating an effect often referred to as Jesus's "halo". Only his final words, in Aramaic, Eli, Eli lama asabthani? (My God, my God, why have you forsaken me?), are sung without this "halo".

In the revision of 1743–1746, it is also these words (the Vox Christi) that receive a sustained continuo part. In all prior versions (1727/1729, 1736, and 1742), the continuo part was sustained in all recitatives.

Interpolated texts 
The arias, set to texts by Picander, are interspersed between sections of the Gospel text. They are sung by soloists with a variety of instrumental accompaniments, typical of the oratorio style. The interpolated texts theologically and personally interpret the Gospel texts. Many of them include the listener into the action, such as the chorale No. 10, "" ("It is I who should suffer"), after eleven disciples asked "" (Lord, is it I?) – meaning: Am I the one going to betray? The alto aria No. 6, "", portrays a desire to anoint Jesus with her tears out of remorse. The bass aria No. 65, "Mache dich, mein Herze, rein", offers to bury Jesus himself. Jesus is often referred to as "my Jesus". The chorus alternates between participating in the narrative and commenting on it.

As is typical of settings of the Passion (and originating in its liturgical use on Palm Sunday), there is no mention of the Resurrection in any of these texts (apart from indirect allusions at Matthew 26:32 and 27:53 and 63). Following the concept of Anselm of Canterbury, the crucifixion is the endpoint and the source of redemption; the emphasis is on the suffering of Jesus. The chorus sings, in the final chorale No. 62, "tear me from my fears / through your own fear and pain." The bass, referring to the "sweet cross" expresses in No. 56, "Yes, of course this flesh and blood in us / want to be forced to the cross; / the better it is for our soul, / the more bitter it feels."

The first "" chorale compares Jesus' crucifixion to the ritual sacrifice of an Old Testament lamb, as an offering for sin. This theme is reinforced by the concluding chorale of the first part,  (O man, bewail your great sin).

Compositional style 
Bach's recitatives often set the mood for the particular passages by highlighting emotionally charged words such as "crucify", "kill", or "mourn" with chromatic melodies. Diminished seventh chords and sudden modulations accompany Jesus's apocalyptic prophecies.

In the turba parts, the two choruses sometimes alternate in cori spezzati style (e.g. "") and sometimes sing together (""). Other times only one chorus sings (chorus I always takes the parts of the disciples) or they alternate, for example when "some bystanders" say "He's calling for Elijah", and "others" say "Wait to see if Elijah comes to help him."

In the arias, obbligato instruments are equal partners with the voices, as was customary in late Baroque arias. Bach often uses madrigalisms, as in "", where the flutes start playing a raindrop-like staccato as the alto sings of drops of his tears falling. In "", the line about the serpent is set with a twisting melody. In "Erbarm es, Gott", the relentless dotted rhythm of the diminished chords evoke the emotional shock of the scourging.

Structure 

As in other Passion oratorios the backbone of the structure is the narration of the Gospel, in this case chapters 26 and 27 of the Gospel of Matthew in the German translation of the Luther Bible.

Gospel text
The Evangelist, a tenor voice, sings the Gospel text in a declamatory style called secco recitative, that is, with only a continuo accompaniment. Direct speech sections of the Gospel text are brought by other singers in the same "secco" format (e.g. a soprano voice sings the words spoken by Pontius Pilate's wife), except for:
 Vox Christi: the words spoken by Christ are sung by a bass as an accompagnato recitative, that is: accompanied by strings, and in a more arioso style than the secco recitatives.
 Turba choruses: words spoken by a group of people (e.g. Jesus' disciples) are sung by the choir, usually accompanied by the complete orchestra.

Apart from the Evangelist and the Vox Christi the dramatis personae of these Gospel sections of the St Matthew Passion consists of:
 Judas (B), Peter (B), two witnesses (A T), two high priests (B), two maids (S), Pilate (B) and his wife (S)
 A small group is represented by Chorus I or Chorus II separately (Chorus I always for the disciples); High priests and larger groups of people are sung by Chorus I and II together.

Interpolated text
In between the sections or scenes of the Gospel text, other texts are sung as a meditation or underlining the action, in a variety of formats:
 soloists sing arias, in most cases preceded by an accompagnato recitative, and occasionally in a dialogue with the choir. These sections are based nearly exclusively on texts by Picander. The arias are in da capo format (ternary form). "Erbarme dich", for alto, and "Mache dich, mein Herze, rein", for bass, are examples of such arias in Part Two of the oratorio. In these movements the singers are accompanied by one or a few solo instruments and continuo, occasionally completed by other instrument groups of the orchestra.
 Choral movements come in two additional formats (apart from the turba and dialogue with soloist roles already mentioned above): 
 Cornerstone choral movements, or chorale fantasias: these are the extended movements, typically used to open or close both parts of the oratorio. In the St Matthew Passion there are three such extended choral movements: the opening chorus ("Kommt, ihr Töchter, helft mir klagen", text by Picander and Nicolaus Decius), the conclusion of Part One ("O Mensch, bewein dein Sünde groß", text by Sebald Heyden) and the final chorus ("Wir setzen uns mit Tränen nieder", text by Picander)
 Chorale harmonization movements: using traditional chorale texts and their melodies. The text is sung in homophony by a four-part chorus with colla parte accompaniment by the orchestra. "O Haupt voll Blut und Wunden", on a text by Paul Gerhardt, is the one that returns most often throughout the Passion, in different harmonizations.

Overview
In the scheme below indentation indicates the type of movement:

|→ Cornerstone choral movements
|→ Gospel parts (including Vox Christi and Turba sections) – Evangelist sings in each of these Gospel sections
|→ Chorale harmonizations
|→ (Non-Gospel) Recitatives and Arias (with or without dialogue with the chorus)

Part One 

1.  –  (Chorus I & II – Cantus firmus by ripieno soprano choir)
2. Mt 26:1–2, with Vox Christi
3. 
4.
5–6. Recitative  and Aria  (alto)
7. Mt 26:14–16, with Judas (bass)
8. Aria  (soprano)
9.
10. "" by Paul Gerhardt, stanza 5: 
11. Mt 26:23–29, with Vox Christi and Judas (bass)
12–13. Recitative  and Aria  (soprano)
14. Mt 26:30–32, with Vox Christi
15. "" by Paul Gerhardt, stanza 5: 
16. Mt 26:33–35, with Vox Christi and Peter (bass)
17. "" by Paul Gerhardt, stanza 6:  [1727/1729 version without music and text ""]
18. Mt 26:36–38, with Vox Christi
19–20. Recitative  – "" by Johann Heermann, stanza 3:  and Aria  –  (tenor – Chorus II)
21. Mt 26:39
22–23. Recitative  and Aria  (bass)
24. Mt 26:40–42, with Vox Christi
25. "" by Albert, Duke in Prussia, stanza 1: 
26. Mt 26:43–50, with Vox Christi and Judas (bass)
27.
28. Mt 26:51–56, with Vox Christi
29.  (Chorale fatasie, text by Sebald Heyden) [1727/1729 version: ""; 1742 and 1743–1746 versions: ripieno soprano choir added to soprano line]

Part Two 

30. Aria  –  (alto [bass in the 1727/1729 version] – Chorus II)
31. Mt 26:57–60a
32. "" by Adam Reusner, stanza 5: 
33. Mt 26:60b–63a, with Witnesses (alt, tenor) and High Priest (bass)
34–35. Recitative  and Aria  (tenor) 
36.
37. "" by Paul Gerhardt, stanza 3: 
38.
39. Aria  (alto)
40. "" by Johann Rist, stanza 6: 
41.
42. Aria  (bass)
43. Mt 27:7–14, with Vox Christi and Pilate (bass)
44. "" by Paul Gerhardt, stanza 1: Befiehl du deine Wege
45.
46. "" by Johann Heermann, stanza 4: 
47. Mt 27:23a, with Pilate (bass)
48–49. Recitative  and Aria  (soprano)
50.
51–52. Recitative  and Aria  (alto)
53.
54. "" by Paul Gerhardt, stanza 1 and 2: 
55. Mt 27:31–32
56–57. Recitative  and Aria  (bass)
58.
59–60. Recitative  and Aria  –  (alto – Chorus II) 
61.
62. "" by Paul Gerhardt, stanza 9: 
63.
64–65. Recitative  and Aria  (bass)
66.
67. Recitative  –  (bass, tenor, alto, soprano – Chorus II)
68.  (Chorus I & II)

Movements 
The work is divided into two parts to be performed before and after the sermon of the Good Friday service.

Part One 
The first scenes are in Jerusalem: Jesus announces his death (No. 2), on the other hand the intention to get rid of him is expressed (No. 4). A scene in Bethany (No. 4c) shows a woman anointing his head with valuable oils. The next scene (No. 7) has Judas Iscariot negotiating the price for handing Jesus over. In a great contrast of mood the preparation for the "Easter meal" (Osterlamm) is described (No. 9) and the Passover meal itself, the Last Supper, foreshadowed by the announcement of betrayal. After the meal they go together to the Mount of Olives (No. 14) where Jesus predicts that Peter will deny him three times before the cock crows. At the garden of Gethsemane (No. 18) Jesus asks his followers several times to support him but they fall asleep while he is praying in agony. It is there (No. 26) that he is betrayed by Judas' kiss and arrested. While soprano and alto mourn (in duet, No. 27a) Jesus's arrest, the chorus makes angry interjections of "" (Leave him, stop, do not bind him!). In a dramatic highpoint of the Passion, the chorus (No. 27b) furiously demands against the Jews who arrested Jesus "" (Wreck, ruin, engulf, shatter with sudden force the false betrayer, the murderous blood!).

1.  

Part One is opened by the chorus "" (Come ye daughters, join my lament), on a text by Picander.

The dialogue with these questions is repeated, and then, from measure 30, Chorus I sings the text of the incipit again while in ripieno sopranos sing the first two lines of Nikolaus Decius' chorale "" (O Lamb of God, innocent) as the cantus firmus. All sentences of the first stanza of Decius' hymn are used as cantus firmus throughout the movement by the ripienists.

The opening chorus continues by taking up the questions and answers by Chorus I and II again, now adding:  (See it! — What? – See the endurance) and ultimately  (Look! — Where? — to our guilt), after which Chorus I and II sing the last lines of Picander's text in separate blocks. When the cantus firmus has died out, Chorus I and II return to the first three lines of the text, from measure 82 until the conclusion of the chorus in measure 90.

2. Mt 26:1–2 
2. Evangelist, Jesus: 
 places the first scene two days before the Passover feast. After a few words of introduction by the Evangelist, the first words of Christ, set as an accompagnato recitative with slow strings, contain an ominous prediction of his imminent fate.

3.  
Chorale: first stanza of Johann Heermann's "". The first two lines of the hymn are a rhetorical question: "My dearest Jesus, which crimes have you committed, that such dire judgement has been passed?"

4. Mt 26:3–13 
4a. Evangelist: 
4b. Chorus I & II: 
4c. Evangelist: 
4d. Chorus I: 
4e. Evangelist, Jesus:

5–6.  –  
Recitative and Aria for alto.

7. Mt 26:14–16 
7. Evangelist, Judas:

8.  
Aria (soprano)

9. Mt 26:17–22 
9a. Evangelist: 
9b. Chorus I: 
9c. Evangelist, Jesus: 
9d. Evangelist: 
9e. Chorus I: 

The narration follows Jesus' instructions for securing the upper room for Passover, and the beginning of the Last Supper. Upon Jesus' declaration that one of the twelve will betray him in 9d, they ask him "Lord, is it I?" The word Herr appears 11 times, once for each disciple except Judas Iscariot.

10.  
Chorale

11. Mt 26:23–29 
11. Evangelist, Jesus, Judas:

12–13.  –  
Recitative and Aria (soprano)

14. Mt 26:30–32 
14. Evangelist, Jesus:

15.  
Chorale

16. Mt 26:33–35 
16. Evangelist, Peter, Jesus:

17.  
Chorale

In the 1727/1729 version without music and text ""

18. Mt 26:36–38 
18. Evangelist, Jesus:

19–20.  –  
Recitative and Aria for tenor

21. Mt 26:39 
21. Evangelist:

22–23.  –  
Recitative and Aria (bass)

24. Mt 26:40–42 
24. Evangelist, Jesus:

25.  
Chorale

26. Mt 26:43–50 
26. Evangelist, Jesus, Judas:

27.  –  
Aria for soprano and alto and Chorus (I & II)

28. Mt 26:51–56 
28. Evangelist, Jesus:

29.  
Part I is closed by a four-part Chorale Fantasia (both choirs) on the chorale  (O mankind, mourn your great sins), recapitulating that Jesus was born of the Virgin to "become the intercessor". The sopranos sing the cantus firmus, the other voices interpret aspects of the narration. In the 1742 and 1743–1746 versions, a ripieno soprano choir was added to the soprano line.

In the 1727/1729 version, this part is concluded by a four-part setting of verse 6 of the Chorale "".

Part Two 
The first scene of Part Two is an interrogation at the High Priest Caiaphas (No. 37) where two witnesses report Jesus having spoken about destroying the Temple and building it again in three days. Jesus is silent to this, but his answer to the question if he is the Son of God is considered a sacrilege calling for his death. Outside in the courtyard (No. 38) Peter is told three times that he belongs to Jesus and denies it three times – then the cock crows. In the morning (No. 41) Jesus is sent to Pontius Pilate while Judas is overcome by remorse and kills himself. Pilate interrogates Jesus (No. 43), is impressed and is inclined to release him, as it was customary to release one prisoner for the holiday, supported in this by his wife. But the crowd, given the choice to have Jesus released or Barabbas, a thief, insurrectionist and murderer, asks with one voice "Barrabam!". They vote to crucify Jesus, Pilate gives in, washing his hands claiming his innocence, and delivers Jesus to torture and crucifixion. On the way to the crucifixion site (No. 55) Simon of Cyrene is forced to carry the cross. At Golgatha (No. 58) Jesus and two others are crucified and mocked by the crowd. Even his last words are misunderstood. Where he cites Psalm 22, "Eli, Eli, lama asabthani?" (My God, my God, why have you forsaken me?), he is supposed to have called Elijah. He dies. St. Matthew describes the tearing of the Temple curtain and an earthquake – set to music by Bach. In the evening (No. 63c) Joseph of Arimathea asks Pilate for the corpse for burial. The following day (No. 66) officials remind Pilate of the talk of resurrection and ask for guards and a seal for the grave to prevent fraud.

30.  
Part Two is opened by a dialog between the alto soloist deploring her lost Jesus and choir II offering help in searching for him, quoting Song of Songs 6:1. In the 1727/1729 version, the soloist is a bass.

31. Mt 26:57–60a 
31. Evangelist:

32.  
Chorale

33. Mt 26:60b–63a 
33. Evangelist, Witnesses, High Priest:

34–35.  –  
Recitative and Aria (tenor)

36. Mt 26:63b–68 
36a. Evangelist, High Priest, Jesus: 
36b. Chorus I & II: 
36c. Evangelist: 
36d. Chorus I & II:

37.  
Chorale

38. Mt 26:69–75 
38a. Evangelist, Maid, Peter, Maid II: 
38b. Chorus II: 
38c. Evangelist, Peter:

39.  
Aria (alto)

40.  
Chorale

41. Mt 27:1–6 
41a. Evangelist, Judas: 
41b. Chorus I & II: 
41c. Evangelist, High Priests:

42.  
Aria (bass)

43. Mt 27:7–14 
43. Evangelist, Pilate, Jesus:

44.  
Chorale

45. Mt 27:15–22 
45a. Evangelist, Pilate, Pilate's wife: 
Chorus I & II: 
45b. Chorus I & II:

46.  
Chorale

47. Mt 27:23a 
47. Evangelist, Pilate:

48–49.  –  
Recitative and Aria (soprano)

50. Mt 27:23b–26 
50a. Evangelist: 
50b. Chorus I & II: 
50c. Evangelist, Pilate: 
50d. Chorus I & II: 
50e. Evangelist:

51–52.  –  
Recitative and Aria (alto)

53. Mt 27:27–30 
53a. Evangelist: 
53b. Chorus I & II: 
53c. Evangelist:

54.  
Chorale

55. Mt 27:31–32 
55. Evangelist:

56–57.  –  
Recitative and Aria (bass) Lute instead of Viola da gamba in 1727/1729 version.

58. Mt 27:33–44 
58a. Evangelist: 
58b. Chorus I & II: 
58c. Evangelist: 
58d. Chorus I & II: 
58e. Evangelist:

59–60.  –  
Recitative and Aria for alto (from Chorus I), with a dialogue with Chorus II ("") in the Aria

61. Mt 27:45–50 
61a. Evangelist, Jesus: 
61b. Chorus I: 
61c. Evangelist: 
61d. Chorus II: 
61e. Evangelist:

62.  
Chorale

This is by far the most unusually chromatic setting of this chorale tune found in the Passion, occurring at the high point of intensity at the death of Jesus. This also marks the completion of Bach's gradual emptying out of the key signature in subsequent settings of this tune: No. 15 has four sharps (E major), No. 17 has three flats (E-flat major), No. 44 has two sharps (D major), No. 54 has one flat (D minor), and No. 62 has no accidentals (A minor).

63. Mt 27:51–59 
63a. Evangelist: 
63b. Chorus I & II: 
63c. Evangelist:

64–65.  –  
Recitative and Aria (bass)

66. Mt 27:59–66 
66a. Evangelist: 
66b. Chorus I & II: 
66c. Evangelist, Pilate:

67.  
Recitative for bass, tenor, alto and soprano, with Chorus II singing .

68.  
The work is closed by a grand scale chorus in da capo form, choir I and II mostly in unison for the first part  (We sit down in tears), but in dialog in the middle section, choir II repeating "" ("Rest gently, gently rest!"), choir I reflecting: "Your grave and headstone shall, for the anxious conscience, be a comfortable pillow and the resting place for the soul. Highly contented, there the eyes fall asleep." These are the last words (before the recapitulation), marked by Bach himself: p pp ppp (soft, very soft, extremely soft).

Reception 

The St Matthew Passion was not heard in more or less its entirety outside Leipzig until 1829, when the twenty-year-old Felix Mendelssohn performed a version in Berlin, with the Berlin Singakademie, to great acclaim. Mendelssohn's revival brought the music of Bach, particularly the large-scale works, to public and scholarly attention (although the St John Passion had been rehearsed by the Singakademie in 1822).

Sterndale Bennett 1845 edition of the Passion was to be the first of many (as Adolph Bernhard Marx and Adolf Martin Schlesinger's one in 1830), the latest being by Neil Jenkins (1997) and Nicholas Fisher and John Russell (2008). Appreciation, performance and study of Bach's composition have persisted into the present era.

Second half of the 18th century
The Passion was performed under the Cantor of St. Thomas until about 1800. Specifically, in 1780, the Cantor, Doles, had three of Bach's Passions performed, assumed to include the St. John and St. Matthew, and "possibly the St. Luke".

19th century

In 1824, Felix Mendelssohn's maternal grandmother Bella Salomon had given him a copy of the score of the Passion. Carl Friedrich Zelter had been head of the Sing-Akademie since 1800. He had been hired to teach music theory to both Felix Mendelssohn and his sister Fanny. Zelter had a supply of J. S. Bach scores and was an admirer of Bach's music but he was reluctant to undertake public performances.

When Felix Mendelssohn was preparing his revival performance of the Passion in 1829 in Berlin (the first performance outside Leipzig), he cut out "ten arias (about a third of them), seven choruses (about half), [but] only a few of the chorales," which "emphasized the drama of the Passion story ... at the expense of the reflective and Italianate solo singing."

In 1827, Felix and a few friends began weekly sessions to rehearse the Passion. One of the group was Eduard Devrient, a baritone and since 1820 one of the principal singers at the Berlin Royal Opera. Around December 1828 – January 1829 Devrient persuaded Felix that the two of them should approach Zelter to get the Sing-Akademie to support their project. Devrient was especially enthusiastic, hoping to sing the part of Jesus as he eventually did. Zelter was reluctant but eventually gave his approval; that of the Singakademie board followed.

Once the fuller group of singers and the orchestra were brought in, Devrient recalled, participants were amazed at "the abundance of melodies, the rich expression of emotion, the passion, the singular style of declamation, and the force of the dramatic action." The 20-year-old Felix himself conducted the rehearsals and first two performances by the Singakademie.

Their first performance was effectively publicized in six consecutive issues of the Berliner Allgemeine Musikalische Zeitung, founded and edited by Adolf Bernhard Marx. It took place on 11 March 1829 and was sold out quickly. There was a second performance on 21 March, also sold out. In a third, on 18 April, Zelter conducted, and soon there were performances in Frankfurt (where a previously projected performance of the Passion had been upstaged by those in Berlin) and in Breslau and Stettin.

William Sterndale Bennett became a founder of the Bach Society of London in 1849 with the intention of introducing Bach's works to the English public. Helen Johnston (a student at Queen's College, London) translated the libretto of the Passion, and Bennett conducted the first English performance at the Hanover Square Rooms London on 6 April 1854 (the same year that it appeared in print by the Old Bach Society (Alte Bach-Gesellschaft). The soloists included Charlotte Helen Sainton-Dolby.

20th century
Excerpts of the work were performed on the American television program Omnibus on 31 March 1957 in the episode "The Music of J.S. Bach." The presenter and explicator was Leonard Bernstein, who introduced the St Matthew Passion as "that glorious work that started me off on my own private passion for Bach."

The St Matthew Passion has been presented in staged performances. Typically, these are done with all performers in street clothes or neutral costumes, the orchestras on stage, at least the soloists singing without scores from memory, and the words acted out in a solemn, melodramatic fashion with only a minimal stage set. On the other hand, George Balanchine staged it in 1943 with Stokowski conducting. Other notable staged performances include Jonathan Miller's 1997 production in English.

The Hamburg Ballet presented a Saint Matthew Passion, created and choreographed by John Neumeier, at the Hamburg State Opera in 1981. The Hamburg Ballet production has been reproduced several times, including at the Brooklyn Academy of Music in New York in 1983 and the Los Angeles Opera in 2022. The Los Angeles Opera presentation involved "42 dancers, six singers, two choruses, and two mighty-in-sound chamber orchestras."

21st century

Transcriptions
The final chorus Wir setzen uns mit Tränen nieder was transcribed for solo organ by Charles-Marie Widor in 1925, as part of the set of 6 pieces named Bach's Memento.

References

Sources 
 
 
 Bach-digital:
St. Matthew passion BWV 244
Klagt, Kinder, klagt es aller Welt BWV 244a
St Matthew Passion (early version) BWV 244b
  Second edition: 1734.
 Spitta, Philipp. "Fünftes Buch: Leipziger Jahre von 1723–1734" in Johann Sebastian Bach, Zweiter Band. Breitkopf & Härtel, 1880.
"Fünftes Buch: Leipziger Jahre von 1723–1734" pp. 3–479 in Johann Sebastian Bach, Zweiter Band. Dritte unveränderte Auflage, Leipzig: Breitkopf & Härtel, 1921.
"Book V: Leipzig, 1723–1734" pp. 181–648 in Johann Sebastian Bach: his work and influence on the music of Germany, 1685–1750, translated by Clara Bell and John Alexander Fuller-Maitland, In Three Volumes, Vol. II. London, Novello & Co, 1884.

Further reading
 
 Franklin, Don O. "The Role of the 'Actus Structure' in the Libretto of J. S. Bach's St. Matthew Passion." In Daniel Zager, ed., Music and Theology: Essays in Honor of Robin A. Leaver. Lanham, MD: The Scarecrow Press, 2007. 121–141. 
 Platen, Emil. Die Matthäus-Passion von Johann Sebastian Bach. Kassel: Bärenreiter, 1991.
 Rifkin, Joshua. "The Chronology of Bach's Saint Matthew Passion". In The Musical Quarterly, lxi (1975). 360–387
 Werker, W. Die Matthäus-Passion. Leipzig, 1923.

External links 

St Matthew Passion: performance by the Netherlands Bach Society (video and background information)
 Autograph score in the Berlin State Library (Staatsbibliothek zu Berlin)
 
Translation to many languages, commentary, musical examples, list of recordings on the bach-cantatas website
The Passion according to Saint Matthew BWV 244 by Joshua Rifkin, on the bach-cantatas website
 "Liturgical drama in Bach's St. Matthew Passion" by Uri Golomb. Goldberg Early Music Magazine 39 (April 2006), pp. 48–59. On the Bach-Cantatas website and on Academia.Edu
Text and translation to English, Emmanuel music
The St. Matthew Passion, Minnesota Public Radio, text and translation, commentary, 2001
St. Matthew Passion (Flash) Helmuth Rilling

Passions and oratorios by Johann Sebastian Bach
1727 compositions
Gospel of Matthew
Oratorios based on the Bible